Major General James Francis Harter DSO MC (1888–1960) was a British Army officer who became colonel of the Royal Fusiliers.

Military career
Harter served with Royal Fusiliers in World War I, being wounded in 1914 and then, as a captain, being awarded the Distinguished Service Order in 1918.

Attending the Staff College, Camberley from 1924 to 1925, during World War II he commanded a formation in the North Midlands. He later served as colonel of the Royal Fusiliers.

References

Bibliography

External links
Generals of World War II

British Army generals of World War II
British Army personnel of World War I
1888 births
1960 deaths
Companions of the Distinguished Service Order
Recipients of the Military Cross
Royal Fusiliers officers
Graduates of the Staff College, Camberley
British Army major generals
Deputy Lieutenants of Essex
Graduates of the Royal Military College, Sandhurst